The Streets of New York is a lost 1922 American silent drama film directed by Burton King and starring Dorothy Mackaill.
The film is based on a Victorian era play by Dion Boucicault The Streets of New York.

Cast
Anders Randolf as Gideon Bloodgood
Leslie King as Badger
Barbara Castleton as Lucy Bloodgood
Edward Earle as Paul Fairweather
Dorothy Mackaill as Sally Ann
Kate Blancke as Jenny

References

External links

1922 films
Lost American films
American films based on plays
American silent feature films
American black-and-white films
Films directed by Burton L. King
Silent American drama films
1922 drama films
1922 lost films
Lost drama films
Arrow Film Corporation films
1920s American films